Xenocytaea taveuniensis is a jumping spider species in the genus Xenocytaea. It was first identified in 2011 by Barbara Maria Patoleta.

Description

Distribution
Xenocytaea taveuniensis is found in Fiji.

References

Spiders of Fiji
Salticidae
Spiders described in 2011